Banksia comosa, commonly known as Wongan dryandra, is a species of shrub that is endemic to Western Australia. It has linear leaves with widely spaced, sharply pointed serrations, heads of yellow flowers and glabrous fruit.

Description
Banksia comosa is a dense, bushy shrub that typically grows to a height of  but does not form a lignotuber. Each side of the leaf has between eight and fifteen well-shaped, sharply pointed, narrow triangular teeth.

Taxonomy and naming
This species was first formally described in 1848 by Carl Meissner who gave it the name Dryandra carlinoides and published the description in de Candolle's Prodromus Systematis Naturalis Regni Vegetabilis from specimens collected by James Drummond. The specific epithet (comosa) is a Latin word meaning "having tufts of hairs or of leaves". In 2007 Austin Mast and Kevin Thiele transferred all dryandras to the genus Banksia and renamed this species Banksia comosa.

Distribution and habitat
Wongan dryandra grows in kwongan and is only known from Wongan Hills.

Conservation status
This banksia is classified as "Priority Four" by the Government of Western Australia Department of Parks and Wildlife, meaning that is rare or near threatened.

References

 

comosa
Plants described in 1856
Endemic flora of Western Australia
Eudicots of Western Australia
Taxa named by Kevin Thiele